Antonio J. Marino (January 7, 1921 − November 17, 2013) was an American politician who served as the 50th and 52nd Mayor of Lynn, Massachusetts.

He was born in Brooklyn, New York, to Emilio and Elettra (née Senatore) Marino and was raised in Lynn. He was a graduate of Lynn Classical High School and Burdette College.

Marino died at Edith Nourse Rogers Veterans Hospital in Bedford, Massachusetts. He is the survived by his wife Ingrid (née Graff).

References

1921 births
2013 deaths
Politicians from  Brooklyn
Mayors of Lynn, Massachusetts